Türdük is a mountain village in Jalal-Abad Region, Kyrgyzstan. It lies at the confluence of the rivers Türdük and Jaryk-Tash. It is part of the Aksy District. Its population was 215 in 2021.

References

Populated places in Jalal-Abad Region